Boo Boo and the Man is a 2002 short cartoon starring Boo Boo Bear, the sidekick of Yogi Bear. It was made by The Ren & Stimpy Show creator John Kricfalusi and his company Spümcø using Macromedia Flash. The short was one of the last Web Premiere Toons shorts produced for Cartoon Network's official website.

The cartoon centers around Boo Boo, who encounters with the group of mean teenage bear bullies.

Plot
The cartoon starts where Boo Boo is happily skipping along in the forest of Jellystone Park, until he comes across the teenage cub bullies, who asks him about who is a "big brown man" with him. Boo Boo replies that the "big brown man" is his best friend Yogi.

As the bullies are having fun picking on Boo Boo with mean things (such as shaving his fur off of his tail, rubbing his tail into pink, and putting a bee inside his ear), Ranger Smith stops them, which causes the bullies to flee away, leaving Boo Boo injured. Ranger Smith helps poor Boo Boo up and Boo Boo asks the ranger about those bullies he met, wondering why they have to act mean to little bears. Smith then answers to Boo Boo that it's rough for the fact that the forest is rough on little fellows like him and tells him that he has to "bear" with the facts, right before Yogi shows up riding a tricycle and asks Boo Boo if he want to tag along with him for some picnic goodies. After the two bears leave, Ranger Smith breaks the fourth wall by telling the audience about although he still has his likes of Boo Boo since he is surely a nice bear, he just doesn't know what he sees in that..... man. The tree burps in his face before the cartoon cuts to black.

Voice cast
Boo Boo Bear: John Kricfalusi
Sam:  Keith Rainville
Ranger Smith: Corey Burton
Yogi Bear: Stephen Worth
Manny: Mike Fontanelli
Sock Bear: Paul Trauth
Angie: Derrick Wyatt
Pointy-Nosed Bear: Gabe Swarr

Crew
Directed by John Kricfalusi
Storyboard: Robyn Byrd
Story by John Kricfalusi and Robyn Byrd
Executive Producers: John Kricfalusi and Kevin Kolde
Executives in charge of Production at Cartoon Network: Sam Register and Pola Changnon
Creative Coordinator: Matt Schwartz
Music Selection: Stephen Worth
Layout: John Kricfalusi and José Pou

Animation
John Kricfalusi
José Pou
 Paul Trauth
 Wil Branca
 Gabe Swarr
Matt Danner

Flash animation
 Paul Trauth
 Gabe Swarr
 Wil Branca
 Robyn Byrd

Inking
 Wil Branca
 Luke Cormican
 José Pou
Nick Cross
 Kristy Gordon
 Mike Kerr
 Audra Brasseau
 Fred Osmond 
 Ray Morelli

Digital clean-up
 Wil Branca
 Luke Cormican
 José Pou
Nick Cross
 Cris Beaupre
 Kristy Gordon
 Mike Kerr
 Audra Brasseau
 Rich Behrle
 Adam Shipman

References

Yogi Bear television specials
Spümcø
2002 films
2000s American animated films
American parody films